Just a Girl is a British silent motion picture of 1916 directed by Alexander Butler and starring Owen Nares, Daisy Burrell and Paul England. A romance, it was adapted by Harry Engholm from Charles Garvice's novel of the same title published in 1895.

Plot
Esmeralda, an Australian heiress played by Daisy Burrell, is courted by Lord Trafford (Owen Nares), an English peer in need of money. However, she refuses him and marries the man she loves, Norman Druce, a humble miner.

Cast
 Owen Nares – Lord Trafford
 Daisy Burrell – Esmeralda 
 J. Hastings Batson – Duke
 Minna Grey – Duchess 
 Paul England – Norman Druce (the miner)

Overseas
The film was distributed in Sweden under the title Australiens vilda ros ('Australia's Wild Rose') and subtitled Esmeralda, lägrets stolthet ('Esmeralda, Pride of the Camp'). The Swedish premiere was at the Odeon, Stockholm, on 3 October 1917.

References

External links

Just a Girl by Charles Garvice

1916 films
British silent feature films
1910s English-language films
Films directed by Alexander Butler
Films based on British novels
Films set in England
British black-and-white films
British romance films
1910s romance films
Silent romance films
1910s British films